Rochdale Rugby Football Club is an English rugby union team based in Rochdale, Greater Manchester. The first XV currently plays in North 2 West, a level 7 league in the English league system, following the club's relegation from North 1 West at the end of the 2017–18 season. The first XV are the current holders of the Lancashire Trophy and are the most successful club in this competition, winning the competition a total of 5 times. Each weekend the club field 3 senior sides, mini & junior teams from under 7's through to senior colts along with 3 Girls teams (U13, U15 & U18s). In the 2018/19 season the club is forming its first adult age Ladies team.  The 'Expendables' (over 35's) play invitational games during the season.

Dan Kelly, one of Rochdale RUFC junior players has now been selected for his first cap against Canada at Twickenham.

Club Honours
North West 3 champions: 1999–00
North Lancs/Cumbria champions: 2001–02
South Lancs/Cheshire 1 champions: 2004–05
North Division 2 West champions: 2008–09

References

External links
Official club website

English rugby union teams
1921 establishments in England
Rugby clubs established in 1921
Sport in Rochdale